Daniil Medvedev defeated Denis Shapovalov in the final, 4–6, 6–3, 6–2 to win the singles tennis title at the 2022 Vienna Open.

Alexander Zverev was the reigning champion, but did not compete due to an ongoing ankle injury.

Seeds

Draw

Finals

Top half

Bottom half

Qualifying

Seeds

Qualifiers

Lucky losers

Qualifying draw

First qualifier

Second qualifier

Third qualifier

Fourth qualifier

References

External links
 Main draw
 Qualifying draw

Erste Bank Open - Singles
2022 Singles